Knox County is a county located in the northeast portion of the U.S. state of Missouri. As of the 2020 census, its population was 3,744,  making it the third-least populous county in Missouri. Its county seat is Edina. The county was organized February 14, 1845 and named for U.S. Secretary of War General Henry Knox.

Civil War
A battle was fought during the American Civil War at Newark, involving Joseph C. Porter on August 1, 1862.

Geography

Adjacent counties
Scotland County (north)
Clark County (northeast)
Lewis County (east)
Shelby County (south)
Macon County (southwest)
Adair County (west)

Major highways
 Route 6
 Route 11
 Route 15
 Route 151
 Route 156

Demographics

As of the census of 2010, there were 4,131 people in the county, organized into 1,791 households and 1,217 families.  The population density was 9 people per square mile (3/km2).  There were 2,317 housing units at an average density of 5 per square mile (2/km2).  The racial makeup of the county was 98.51% White, 0.09% Black or African American, 0.09% Asian, 0.02% Native American, 0.16% from other races, and 1.12% from two or more races. Approximately 0.60% of the population were Hispanic or Latino of any race.

There were 1,791 households, out of which 27.90% had children under the age of 18 living with them, 57.50% were married couples living together, 6.90% had a female householder with no husband present, and 32.00% were non-families. 29.30% of all households were made up of individuals, and 16.00% had someone living alone who was 65 years of age or older.  The average household size was 2.38 and the average family size was 2.93.

24.90% of the county's population was under the age of 18, 6.20% from 18 to 24, 23.70% from 25 to 44, 23.90% from 45 to 64, and 21.20% who were 65 years of age or older.  The median age was 42 years.  For every 100 females there were 92.9 males.  For every 100 females age 18 and over, there were 91.6 males.

The median income for a household in the county was $27,124, and the median income for a family was $31,741. Males had a median income of $22,636 versus $18,902 for females. The per capita income for the county was $13,075.  18.00% of the population and 12.90% of families were below the poverty line.  Out of the total population, 24.10% of those under the age of 18 and 16.50% of those 65 and older were living below the poverty line.

The TFR for Knox County in 2004 was relatively high at 2.64, despite the population being 98% white.

2020 Census

Education

Public schools
Knox County R-I School District – Edina
Knox County Elementary School (PK-06) 
Knox County High School (07-12)

Public libraries
 Northeast Missouri Library Service

Politics

Local
The Democratic Party mostly controls politics at the local level in Knox County. Democrats hold all but five of the elected positions in the county.

State

All of Knox County is included in Missouri's 4th District in the Missouri House of Representatives and is represented by  Craig Redmon (R-Canton).

 

All of Knox County is a part of Missouri's 18th District in the Missouri Senate and is currently represented by Brian Munzlinger (R-Williamstown).

Federal

All of Knox County is included in Missouri's 6th Congressional District and is currently represented by Sam Graves (R-Tarkio) in the U.S. House of Representatives.

Communities

Cities
Baring
Edina (county seat)
Hurdland
Knox City

Villages
Newark
Novelty

Census-designated place
Plevna

Other unincorporated place

 Colony
 Fabius
 Goodland
 Greensburg
 Hedge City
 Jeddo
 Kenwood
 Locust Hill
 Millport

Townships
Knox County is divided into 13 townships:

Bee Ridge Township
Benton Township
Bourbon Township
Center Township
Colony Township
Fabius Township
Greensburg Township
Jeddo Township
Liberty Township
Lyon Township
Myrtle Township
Salt River Township
Shelton Township

Notable people

Terry Joyce, collegiate football All-American and professional football player.
George Turner, U.S. Senator

See also
 List of counties in Missouri
National Register of Historic Places listings in Knox County, Missouri

References

External links
 Digitized 1930 Plat Book of Knox County  from University of Missouri Division of Special Collections, Archives, and Rare Books

 
1845 establishments in Missouri
Populated places established in 1845